Große Isar may refer to two different branches of the river Isar in Bavaria, Germany:
Große Isar (Munich), in the town of Munich
Große Isar (Landshut), in the town of Landshut